Fissurella punctata is a species of sea snail, a marine gastropod mollusk in the family Fissurellidae, the keyhole limpets and slit limpets.

Description
The size of the shell varies between 14 mm and 27 mm.

Distribution
This species occurs in the Atlantic Ocean off North Carolina, USA and the Bahamas; off Antigua.

References

External links
 To Biodiversity Heritage Library (1 publication)
 To Encyclopedia of Life
 To ITIS
 To World Register of Marine Species
 

Fissurellidae
Gastropods described in 1943